James R. Bowie (born February 17, 1965) is a Japanese-American former professional baseball first baseman. He played for the Oakland Athletics during the 1994 season.

Bowie was born in Tokyo to Willard and Taiko Bowie. His father married his mother, a Japanese native, while serving in Japan in the United States Air Force.

Bowie attended Armijo High School in Fairfield, California before playing college baseball at Sacramento City College and for the LSU Tigers. In 2012, he became the first athlete to have his uniform number retired by Armijo High.

References

External links

1965 births
Living people
African-American baseball players
American expatriate baseball players in Canada
American expatriate baseball players in Mexico
Bellingham Mariners players
Calgary Cannons players
Edmonton Trappers players
Huntsville Stars players
Jacksonville Suns players
Major League Baseball first basemen
Major League Baseball players from Japan
Mobile BayBears players
Oakland Athletics players
Petroleros de Poza Rica players
Rieleros de Aguascalientes players
Sacramento City Panthers baseball players
San Bernardino Spirit players
Sportspeople from Tokyo
Tacoma Tigers players
Wausau Timbers players
Williamsport Bills players
21st-century African-American people
20th-century African-American sportspeople
American baseball players of Japanese descent
Japanese people of African-American descent
Baseball players from California
Minor league baseball coaches
African-American baseball coaches